River Glass may refer to:
 River Glass, Isle of Man, a tributary of the River Dhoo
 River Glass, Strathglass, a tributary of the River Beauly, Scotland
 Allt Graad or River Glass, which flows from Loch Glass to the Cromarty Firth in Scotland